Vladimir Vladislavovich Osipov (born 11 September 2001) is a Russian football player.

Club career
He made his debut in the Russian Football National League for FC Neftekhimik Nizhnekamsk on 13 September 2020 in a game against FC Spartak-2 Moscow.

References

External links
 
 Profile by Russian Football National League

2001 births
Living people
Russian footballers
Association football midfielders
FC Neftekhimik Nizhnekamsk players
Russian First League players